The following highways are numbered 732:

Canada

Costa Rica
 National Route 732

United States